Student protests were held in Belgrade, Yugoslavia, as the first mass protest in Yugoslavia after World War II. Protests also broke out in other capitals of Yugoslav republics — Sarajevo, Zagreb and Ljubljana — but they were smaller and shorter than in Belgrade.

After youth protests erupted in Belgrade on the night of 2 June 1968, students of the Belgrade University went into a seven-day strike. Police beat the students and banned all public gatherings. Students then gathered at the Faculty of Philosophy, held debates and speeches on social justice and handed out banned copies of the magazine Student. Students also protested against economic reforms, which led to high unemployment and forced workers to leave the country and find work elsewhere.
In Ljubljana, more than 5000 people gathered on Prešern square. They were violently dispersed by police units from Croatia using batons, tear gas and water canons. Hundreds were injured.
The protests were supported by prominent public personalities, including film director Dušan Makavejev, stage actor Stevo Žigon, poet Desanka Maksimović and university professors, whose careers ran into problems because of their links to the protests.

President Josip Broz Tito gradually stopped the protests by giving in to some of the students’ demands and saying that "students are right" during a televised speech on 9 June, but in the following years dealt with the leaders of the protests by imprisoning students (Vladimir Mijanović, Milan Nikolić, Pavluško Imširović, Lazar Stojanović and others) and by firing critical professors from university and Communist party posts.

See also 
 Belgrade Six

References

Sources 
 "Down with the Red Bourgeoisie of Yugoslavia: An Analysis of the June Students' Insurrection in Belgrade, Yugoslavia" (November 1968). Black & Red. No. 3.
 Fredy Perlman (1969). "Birth of a Revolutionary Movement in Yugoslavia".
 D. Plamenic (March–April 1969). "Belgrade Student Insurrection". New Left Review. No. 54.
 

Yugoslavia
Student demonstrations
Events in Yugoslavia
Political repression in Yugoslavia
1960s in Belgrade
1960s in Zagreb
1960s in Sarajevo
Yugoslavia
Protests in Serbia